Domenico Caracciolo (died 1673) was a Roman Catholic prelate who served as Bishop of Alife (1664–1673).

Biography
Domenico Caracciolo was born in Gaeta, Italy.
On 31 Mar 1664, Domenico Caracciolo was appointed during the papacy of Pope Alexander VII as Bishop of Alife.
He served as Bishop of Alife until his death on 14 Oct 1673.

References

External links and additional sources
 (for Chronology of Bishops) 
 (for Chronology of Bishops) 

17th-century Italian Roman Catholic bishops
Bishops appointed by Pope Alexander VII
1673 deaths